Lincoln High School is a public high school located in Warren, Michigan, United States. It is the only high school in Van Dyke Public Schools, which serves portions of Warren and a small section of Center Line. In the 2009–2010 school year, it had about 920 enrolled students and in the 2015–2016 school year it had 702 students with a ratio of 17.89 students to a teacher.

Trivia 
The Brown Jug rivalry football game between Center Line High School and Lincoln High School began in 1947 and remains one of the oldest high school football rivalries in the state of Michigan.

Notable students 
 Eminem, rapper, dropped out

References 

Educational institutions in the United States with year of establishment missing
Public high schools in Michigan
Schools in Macomb County, Michigan
Warren, Michigan